A double referendum was held in Uruguay on 31 October 1999 alongside general elections. Voters were asked two questions; whether they approved of two initiatives, one on the financial autonomy of the judiciary, and one on preventing directors of state-owned companies from becoming MPs. Both were rejected by voters.

Initiatives

Judiciary
The referendum on the financial judiciary of the judiciary was put forward by the General Assembly after being approved by 41 of the 99 members of the Chamber of Deputies and 12 of the 30 members of the Senate. It would involve amending articles 220, 233 and 239 of the constitution.

Directors of state-owned companies
The referendum on directors of state-owned companies was also put forward by the General Assembly, where it was approved by 61 Deputies and 20 Senators.

Results

Judiciary

Directors of state-owned companies

References

Uruguay
Referendum
Referendums in Uruguay
Uruguay